Andrey Uladzimiravich Dzmitryeu (also known either as Andrey Uladzimiravich Dzmitryew or Andrey Vladimirovich Dmitriev ; born 12 May 1981) is a Belarusian social activist, politician and candidate in the 2020 Belarusian presidential election. He is the current co-chairman of the Tell the Truth, a political movement which is known for raising its voice and vocal criticism of Alexander Lukashenko's authoritarian rule.

Career 
He pursued his higher studies at the European Humanities University in Lithuania. He also became a member of non governmental organisation Tell the Truth. He also worked as a political analyst in campaigns and heading an initiative group of citizens for opposition candidates of Lukashenko during the 2010 Belarusian presidential election (Uladzimir Nyaklyayew) and during the 2015 Belarusian presidential election (Tatsiana Karatkevich). 

He became vice chairman of the Tell the Truth in 2013. In September 2019, he was appointed as the co-chair of the Tell the Truth.

2020 presidential election 
On 8 May, he was nominated as an independent presidential candidate for the 2020 Belarusian presidential election.

On 10 August 2020, the election results were released and Andrey clinched fourth spot among the five candidates with a total valid vote count of 1.21%.

References 

1981 births
Politicians from Minsk
Living people
Candidates for President of Belarus